The Palace Theatre is a 2,695-seat restored movie palace located at 34 W. Broad Street in Columbus, Ohio. It was designed and built in 1926 by the American architect Thomas W. Lamb as part of the American Insurance Union Citadel (now the LeVeque Tower). Today the theater functions as a multi-use performing arts venue. It is owned and operated by The Columbus Association for the Performing Arts. The Palace Theater's "house" is considered separate from LeVeque Tower, while the marquee and lobby are part of the LeVeque complex.

History

The Palace Theatre was designed by Thomas W. Lamb in his signature "Adam" style, reminiscent of the 18th century neo-classical work of the Scottish architects James and Robert Adam. Originally named the Keith-Albee Theatre, its construction was personally supervised by the vaudeville mogul Edward Albee of the Keith-Albee circuit. It opened in 1926 as the Keith-Albee Palace and featured live vaudeville along with silent feature films, an orchestra and "Miss Buckeye", a Style 260 3/16 Mighty Wurlitzer Theatre Pipe Organ.

The dressing room tower in the backstage area was designed as a small hotel, complete with a "front desk", where performers picked up their room keys and mail. Kitchen facilities and a children’s playroom were available. The dressing rooms are named after cities on the vaudeville touring routes.  The under-stage room includes an animal shower and small sanitary stable, along with a ramp built for hoofed animals to help facilitate their transport to and from the stage during the Vaudeville era.

In 1929, the Keith-Albee Palace was renamed the RKO (Radio Keith Orpheum) Palace. The theater was closed as a movie theater by RKO in 1975. It was later renovated and preserved by owner Katherine LeVeque as a home for Opera Columbus and touring Broadway shows. In 1989, the Palace Theatre was purchased by the non-profit theater management company CAPA, which consolidated its administrative functions with those of the Ohio Theatre. The Palace now hosts performances by the Columbus Symphony Orchestra, the Jazz Arts Group, the Broadway Series, and scores of CAPA-sponsored shows.

References

External links
 
 Palace Theatre at CAPA website

1926 establishments in Ohio
Concert halls in Ohio
Culture of Columbus, Ohio
Buildings in downtown Columbus, Ohio
Landmarks in Ohio
Movie palaces
Theatres completed in 1926
Theatres in Columbus, Ohio
Thomas W. Lamb buildings
Broad Street (Columbus, Ohio)